

Georg-Wilhelm Postel (25 April 1896 – 20 September 1953) was a German general during World War II. He was a recipient of the Knight's Cross of the Iron Cross with Oak Leaves and Swords of Nazi Germany.

Postel was taken prisoner by the Red Army on 30 August 1944 after the capitulation of Romania. Convicted as a war criminal in the Soviet Union, he was sentenced to 25 years of forced labour in 1949. Postel died in custody on 20 September 1953 of tuberculosis. He was interred in the prisoner of war cemetery in Shakhty.

Awards 

 Clasp to the Iron Cross (1939)  2nd Class (10 July 1941) & 1st Class (17 August 1941)
 German Cross in Gold on 28 February 1942 as Oberst in 364th Infantry Regiment
  Knight's Cross of the Iron Cross with Oak Leaves and Swords
 Knight's Cross on 9 August 1942 as Oberst and commander of 364th Infantry Regiment
 Oak Leaves on 28 March 1943 as Generalmajor and commander of the 320th Infantry Division
 Swords on 26 March 1944 as Generalleutnant and commander of the 320th Infantry Division

References

Citations

Bibliography

 
 
 

1896 births
1953 deaths
Lieutenant generals of the German Army (Wehrmacht)
People from the Kingdom of Saxony
Recipients of the clasp to the Iron Cross, 1st class
Recipients of the Gold German Cross
Recipients of the Knight's Cross of the Iron Cross with Oak Leaves and Swords
German prisoners of war in World War II held by the Soviet Union
Reichswehr personnel
German people who died in Soviet detention
20th-century deaths from tuberculosis
Military personnel from Saxony
Tuberculosis deaths in the Soviet Union
Tuberculosis deaths in Russia
People from Zittau